Al-Ijabah Mosque, also known as "Bani Muawiyah Mosque" or "Al-Mubahalah Mosque", is a mosque in Medina, Saudi Arabia, which was built during the time of the Islamic prophet Muhammad on a land owned by Muawiyah bin Malik bin 'Auf of the tribe of As-Sus.

Location 
Ther distance to Al-Masjid an-Nabawi (after its expansion in the modern era) is only . Today, this region is a part of Bani Muawiyah District.

Hadith 
There is a hadith about the mosque in Sahih Muslim. It is noted that Amir bin Sa'dari said that when the Prophet Muhammad returned from Al-Aliyah, he passed the Bani Muawiyah Mosque, entered there and prayed for two rakats, and his companions also followed him. He prayed for a long time, then turned toward the companions and spoke about three wishes he requested to God, in which two of them, saving people from famine and flooding were fulfilled, but the last wish regarding the ending of strife among the people was not. According to the isnad (chain of narrations) from Malik and Abdullah bin Jabir bin Atik, Ibnu Umar said that war, slander and strife would continue until the Day of Judgement.

See also 
 Lists of mosques
 List of mosques in Saudi Arabia
 List of mosques in Medina
 Middle East
 Arabia

References

External links 

7th-century mosques
Mosques in Medina